John Hahn-Petersen (4 November 1930 in Frederiksberg – 4 January 2006) was a Danish theatre, TV and movie actor. He made his debut in 1955 and starred in a number of productions, including Matador, Landsbyen, and Taxa.

In 2006 he had one of the leading roles in Henri Nathansen's Indenfor Murene at Det Kongelige Teater, Denmark. He died at the age of 75 of a heart attack, shortly before he was to appear on stage. Following his death Indenfor Murene was cancelled.

Filmography

Film
Lyssky transport gennem Danmark – 1958
Styrmand Karlsen – 1958
Tro, håb og trolddom – 1960
Dyden går amok – 1966
Olsen-banden på sporet – 1975
Du er ikke alene – 1978
Olsen-banden overgiver sig aldrig – 1979
Historien om Kim Skov – 1981
Thorvald og Linda – 1982
Det parallelle lig – 1982
Oviri – 1986
Barndommens gade – 1986
Baby Doll – 1988
Retfærdighedens rytter – 1989
De nøgne træer – 1991
Høfeber – 1991
Jesus vender tilbage – 1992
Sofie – 1992
Sort høst – 1993
Balladen om Holger Danske – 1996
Nonnebørn – 1997
Riget II – 1997
Forbudt for børn – 1998
Humørkort-stativ-sælgerens søn – 2002

Television
Matador – 1978-81
Landsbyen – 1991-96
Gøngehøvdingen – 1992
Alletiders jul – 1994
TAXA – 1997-99
Krøniken – 2002-06
Forsvar – 2003-04

References

External links
 
 John Hahn-Petersen at danskefilm.dk

1930 births
2006 deaths
Danish male stage actors
Danish male film actors
Danish male television actors
People from Frederiksberg